Narsampet is a town in Warangal district of the Indian state of Telangana.
Narsampet is a Mandal in Warangal Rural District of Telangana State, India. Headquarters of Narsampet Revenue Division is in Narsampet Town. As part of Telangana Districts re-organisation, Narsampet Mandal re-organised from Warangal District to Warangal Rural district. The town is 36 km east of District Headquarter Warangal.

There are many mills and colleges in the town. The town has rice mills, oil mills, Agricultural Market Committee, and all departmental offices. The Narsampet town is a main commercial centre, for a region covering about 240 villages including some of villages from Mahabubabad District. The villages depend on Narsampet Town to market their agricultural produce and to procure their consumer needs.

Geography

Narsampet municipality is in Warangal Rural District of Telangana, at 17 degrees 55 minutes north to 79 degrees 54 minutes east. Narsampet has average altitude of 221 meters.

Administration of Narsampet

Narsampet is a historical place in Telangana. Narasmpet was in Andhra Pradesh when it was in colonial times. Before independence, the administrative unit of Narsampet was officially known as Pakhal Taluka because of its proximity to the area's lifeline - the Pakhal Lake, major lake for drinking water in the region built by the Kakatiya rulers. The Government of Telangana merged the neighbouring Dwarakapet and Sarvapuram villages into Narsampet Municipality. The town has 24 wards and 210 colonies.

Politics in Narsampet Mandal
TRS, BJP, and INC are the major political parties in this area. 
Narsampet Mandal comes under Narsampet assembly constituency, the current sitting MLA is Pedhi Sudarshan Reddy from TRS. 
Narsampet Mandal comes under Mahabubabad parliament constituency, the current sitting MP is Kavitha Maloth from TRS

Government and politics 

Civic administration

Narsampet Municipality was constituted in 2011 and has 24 election wards.

Demographics

Narsampet is a Census Town city in the district of Warangal Rural, Telangana. The population of the town as per the 2011 census is 44,231.

Literacy

The literacy rate of Narsampet city is 81.17% higher than the state average of 67.02%. In Narsampet, male literacy is around 89.70% while the female literacy rate is 72.13%.

Weather and Climate of Narsampet
It is hot in summer. Narsampet summer highest day temperature is between 33 °C to 46 °C. 
Average temperatures of January is 25 °C, February is 25 °C, March is 29 °C, April is 33 °C, May is 38 °C

Villages in  Narsampet  Mandal 
 List of villages in Narsampet Rural Mandal
1.Akulthanda
2.Bhanjipeta
3.Bhojyanaikthanda
4.Itikalapalli
5.Enugalthanda
6.Ippalthanda
7.Muthyalammathanda
8.Muthojipeta
9.Rajupeta
10.Chandhraiapalli
11.Rajeshwararaopalli
12.Madhannapeta
13.Nagurlapalli
14.Parshanaikthanda
15.Kammapelli
16.Dasaripalli
17.Maheshwaram
18.Ramulunaikthanda
19.Laknepalli
20.Ramavaram
21.Gurijala
22.ChinnaGurijala
23.GurralaGandi Rajapalli
24.Gunturupalli
25.Rajapalli
26.Mukdumpuram
27.Patha Mukdumpuram.

See also
Bandi Sailu

References 
 villageinfo.in

Mandals in Warangal district
Cities and towns in Warangal district